The US Quadball Cup, previously known as US Quidditch Cup, is a quadball tournament held in the United States and organized by US Quadball. The first US Quidditch Cup was held in 2007, and the tournament features collegiate and club teams from the United States. The tournament was formerly known as the IQA World Cup, but that name now refers to the international championship IQA World Cup.

History
The first intercollegiate Quidditch World Cup was held in 2007 at Middlebury College in Vermont, between Middlebury and Vassar College from Poughkeepsie, New York. Since then, the US Quadball Cup has been held in various places in the continental United States. On average, there are 70 or so teams present that proceed to pool play, where teams are grouped and the top teams from the group advance to bracket play.

The 2014 edition was the last one called "IQA World Cup". Thereafter, the International Quidditch Association became an international sports federation and the organization of the Cup was handed over to US Quadball. Since 2016, the Cup was renamed to "US Quidditch Cup" and the name "IQA World Cup" now refers to an international competition featuring national teams.

Beginning with the 2017-2018 season, there will be separate regional and national championships for club and collegiate teams.

The tournament was not held in 2020 or 2021 due to the COVID-19 pandemic. When the tournament resumed in 2022, it was branded as "US Quidditch Cup 2022" rather than "US Quidditch Cup 13."

Format

Participation
In order to participate in qualification, a team must be registered with USQ. Teams can be either college teams, or community teams. College teams are teams based at a college or university and have only its students on the team; these make up the vast majority of registered quadball teams. A community team is a private club team made up of interested players around the area. Each community team may has its own rules when it comes to trying out or joining the team, and college students may opt to join a community team over their college team. In 2016, Q.C. Boston was the first club team to win the cup. Once a team is started and registered, they may compete in official tournaments.

Qualification
Qualification is achieved through placement in Regional Championships. There are 8 different regions: Great Lakes, Mid-Atlantic, Midwest, Northeast, Northwest, South, Southwest, and West. The Regional Championships, played in tournament form, take place from November to February, with the US Quadball Cup taking place in April. Placing at certain level in each of the respective region's championships (specifics vary per region), which are played in tournament form, will guarantee a berth at the US Quadball Cup.

Pool Play
Before the day of the event, all attending teams are sorted into 12 pools of 5 based on their seeding. Seeding is based on a complex algorithm measuring each team's wins, point differentials, snitch grab percentages and strength of schedule at their respective Regional Championships. After each team plays the other four in their pool, all the teams are ranked by the same algorithm. The top 28 teams get a spot in a seeded round-robin bracket and 29-36 join the play-in round, a pre-bracket playoff round of four games to determine the last 4 teams to join the bracket.

Bracket Play
Starting with a round of 32, teams are matched up and the winner of each match proceeds to the next round until a champion is determined.

Results

See also

 Quadball
 Major League Quidditch
 International Quadball Association

References

External links
IQA World Cup IV archived by the Wayback Machine
IQA World Cup V archived by the Wayback Machine
IQA World Cup VI archived by the Wayback Machine
IQA World Cup VII archived by the Wayback Machine
US Quidditch World Cup 8
US Quidditch Cup 9

 
Quidditch competitions
Recurring sporting events established in 2007
2007 establishments in the United States